Limnonectes sinuatodorsalis is a species of fanged frog in the family Dicroglossidae. It is endemic to Borneo, where it was found in the border region of East Kalimantan and Sarawak.

References

 Matsui, 2015 : A new species of Limnonectes from the border of East Kalimantan and Sarawak, Borneo Island (Anura, Dicroglossidae). Current Herpetology, Kyoto, .
http://research.amnh.org/vz/herpetology/amphibia/Amphibia/Anura/Dicroglossidae/Dicroglossinae/Limnonectes/Limnonectes-sinuatodorsalis

Amphibians of Malaysia
Amphibians of Indonesia
sinuatodorsalis
Amphibians described in 2015